Adelle of the Saracens (active 12th century) was an Italian physician. She belonged to the Saracinensa family and was a lay teacher at the medical faculty of Salerno. Her medical practice stemmed from roots in the Salerno Medical School and she practiced Medieval and Early Italian Renaissance Ideals in her medicine including Humanism.

Background 
Saracen was a term used by European Christians during the Middle Ages to refer to Muslims—usually Arabs, Turks, and Iranians. The term's meaning evolved during its history of usage: in the early centuries of Christianity, both Greek and Latin writings used "Saracen" to refer to the people who lived in and near what was designated by the Romans as Arabia Petraea and Arabia Deserta. During the Early Middle Ages, the term came to be associated with the tribes of Arabia.

Salerno Medical School 
Salerno encompassed an important medical school founded during the Medieval times. It based its curriculum and lifestyle off of many different influences such as Greek, Arabic, Latin, and Hebrew. As one of the first medical schools that was founded around the 9th century in Italy, it greatly influenced the medical works and thought process of the Medieval Times. In addition, women also had the ability to contribute their ideals at this school. This was particularly significant because during this time period, a woman's medical opinion was still narrowly considered as substantial, or even correct. Cultural shifts like these with women in the medical field gave physicians newer ways of thinking. This includes their contributions like backing the idea of the requirement of physicians to have certifications to practice and adding a different viewpoint to some anatomy textbooks which were pertinent in the development of modern-day medicine.

Humanism 
Going into the Italian Renaissance, many medical professionals and physicians pursued their careers with a humanist way of thinking. Humanism refers to the sole focus on humans as a physical being rather than seeing them as being influenced by any supernatural forces. It was a more rational thought process and strictly emphasized the focus on human needs. These influences were particularly seen in translation efforts of Greek manuscripts.

See also 
 Schola Medica Salernitana
 Humanism

References

Bibliography
 
 
 Marilyn Ogilvie & Joy Harvey: Biographical Dictionary of Women in Science

Medieval women physicians
12th-century Italian physicians
Italian women scientists
Women medical researchers
12th-century Italian women
People from Salerno